{{DISPLAYTITLE:C22H28O3}}
The molecular formula C22H28O3 (molar mass: 340.45 g/mol, exact mass: 340.203845 u) may refer to:

 Canrenone, an aldosterone antagonist
 Norethisterone acetate

Molecular formulas